Lim Duk-jun (born 30 August 1980) is a Korean handball player who competed in the 2004 Summer Olympics and the 2012 Summer Olympics.

References

1980 births
Living people
South Korean male handball players
Olympic handball players of South Korea
Handball players at the 2004 Summer Olympics
Handball players at the 2012 Summer Olympics
Asian Games medalists in handball
Handball players at the 2014 Asian Games
Asian Games silver medalists for South Korea
Medalists at the 2014 Asian Games
21st-century South Korean people